Zinnia peruviana, the Peruvian zinnia, is an annual flowering plant in the family Asteraceae. It is native to North America and South America.

Description 
Zinnia peruviana is an annual plant up to 50 cm tall (rarely 100 cm tall). The stems are green, but later become yellow or purple. The leaves are ovate, elliptic or lanceolate, 2.5–7 cm long and 8–3.5 cm wide; 3- to 5-nerved. The peduncles are 1–7 cm long. Flower heads with 6–21 red, maroon or yellow ray florets (with a 0.8–2.5 cm long petal each) surrounding 12–50 yellow disc florets (with 0.1 cm long corolla lobes). Fruits (cypselae) oblanceolate to narrowly elliptic, 0.7–1 cm long, 3-angled or compressed, striate.

Distribution and habitat
The native range of Z. peruviana spans from southeastern Arizona and the Greater Antilles south to Argentina. It grows mostly on open areas or rocky slopes between 800–3000 m of elevation.

It has been introduced to and naturalized in many places such as China, India, Bangladesh, Australia, South Africa and Hawaii.

References

External links
photo of herbarium specimen collected in Nuevo León in Mexico in 1993
line drawing from Manual of Vascular Plants of the Lower Yangtze Valley China Illustration fig. 378 

peruviana
Flora of Mexico
Flora of Central America
Flora of South America
Garden plants of North America
Garden plants of South America
Plants described in 1753
Taxa named by Carl Linnaeus
Flora of Peru